Qadah-e Pain (also Romanized as Qadaḩ-e Pā’īn) is a village in Maspi Rural District, in the Central District of Abdanan County, Ilam Province, Iran. At the 2006 census, its population was 23, in 5 families.

References 

Populated places in Abdanan County